The 2016 California Golden Bears football team represented the University of California, Berkeley in the 2016 NCAA Division I FBS football season. The Bears were led by fourth-year head coach Sonny Dykes and played their home games at Memorial Stadium.  

Shortly after the conclusion of the 2015 season, Dykes stated that he did not anticipate any staff turnover. However, offensive coordinator Tony Franklin resigned from his position at California a few weeks after Dykes made this statement. Franklin left to take up the same position at Middle Tennessee State, citing a desire to move closer to his family in Kentucky. Dykes replaced Franklin with Jake Spavital, who had recently been fired by Texas A&M University. Like Dykes, Spavital was from Mike Leach's Air Raid coaching tree. An additional signing from that lineage was the transfer of quarterback Davis Webb from Texas Tech; Webb completed his bachelor's degree in three years transferring to Cal for his final year of eligibility as a graduate student. 

Cal went 5–7 in 2016, winning only 3 out of their 9 Pac-12 games. Dykes once again lost to Stanford at home by two touchdowns and to USC in Los Angeles by three touchdowns. His team also lost to San Diego State of the Mountain West Conference. Highlights of that season were Cal's second straight beating of then-No. 11 Texas and the team's win over UCLA. This was the first time that Dykes was able to lead the team to beat one of Cal's three traditional rivals – Stanford, UCLA and USC. In his only season as Cal's quarterback, Davis Webb beat Jared Goff's passing attempts and completions records, and equaled his marks for 300-yard passing games (10) and touchdowns (43), with 37 in the air and six on the ground. Webb was drafted in the third round by New York Giants. 

Sonny Dykes was fired on January 8, 2017. He finished at Cal with a four-year record of 19–30. The firing came as a surprise, as his contract was previously extended and most coaching changes come right after the end of a season and not the following year. Two of the stated concerns were Dykes' commitment to the program, as at the end of 2016 Dykes was interviewed by Baylor University for their head coaching position, and the significant decreases in home game attendance – thirty percent fewer season tickets were renewed for 2017 than for the previous year.

Personnel

Coaching staff

Roster

Schedule

Source: 2016 California Golden Bears Football Schedule

Notes

Game summaries

vs. Hawaii

Calling the game for ESPN: Allen Bestwick, Mike Bellotti and Warren Smith.

at San Diego State

Texas

at Arizona State

Utah

at Oregon State

Oregon

at USC

Washington

at Washington State

Stanford

UCLA

References

California
California Golden Bears football seasons
California Golden Bears football